The 12th Central American and Caribbean Games were held in Santo Domingo, Dominican Republic from February 27 to March 13, 1974, and included 1,928 athletes from 23 nations competing in 18 sports.

Sports

References
 Meta
 colimdo
 

 
Central American and Caribbean Games, 1974
Central American and Caribbean Games
Central American and Caribbean Games
Central American and Caribbean Games, 1974
1974 in Central American sport
1974 in Caribbean sport
Multi-sport events in the Dominican Republic
20th century in Santo Domingo
February 1974 sports events in North America
March 1974 sports events in North America
Sports competitions in Santo Domingo